Paul Griffin (born 1 September 1979 in Tralee) is an Irish rower. He finished 6th in the men's lightweight coxless four at the 2004 Summer Olympics and 10th in the men's lightweight coxless four at the 2008 Summer Olympics. He qualified for the 15 km Cross-country Skiing event at the 2010 Winter Olympics but he was not selected because another higher ranked skier was selected ahead of him.

External links 
 
 

1979 births
Living people
Irish male rowers
Olympic rowers of Ireland
Rowers at the 2004 Summer Olympics
Rowers at the 2008 Summer Olympics
Sportspeople from County Kerry
World Rowing Championships medalists for Ireland
21st-century Irish people